The Aegon Eastbourne Trophy was a tournament for professional female tennis players played on outdoor grass courts. The event was classified as a $50,000 ITF Women's Circuit tournament and was held in Eastbourne, United Kingdom, from 2015 to 2016.

Past finals

Singles

Doubles

External links 
 ITF search
 Official website

ITF Women's World Tennis Tour
Grass court tennis tournaments
Tennis tournaments in England
Recurring sporting events established in 2015
Recurring sporting events disestablished in 2016
2015 establishments in England
Defunct tennis tournaments in the United Kingdom